Inter-American Adventist Theological Seminary (IATS) is an educational institution of the Inter‐American Division of the Seventh-day Adventists tasked with equipping ministers within the division with advanced degrees to better serve the church.  IATS is administered from the church's divisional headquarters in Miami, Fl, but classes are taught at several of the church-run universities within the territory. It is accredited by the US-based Association of Theological Schools (ATS)  and The Accrediting Association of Seventh-day Adventist Schools, Colleges, and Universities (AAA).

History
IATS traces its roots to the 1970s when in order to halt the brain-drain of talented ministers to North America SDA colleges within the Inter-American Division (IAD) territory (nations and islands in and/or bordering the Caribbean Sea, including Mexico and the Guianas) began forging relationships with Andrews University in the United States to offer graduate programs in the area. These relationships grew into a formal arrangement between the IAD and the SDA Theological Seminary at Andrews University that allowed ultimately ten campuses within the IAD territory to offer graduate degrees in Theology and Religion.  The program was very successful but the costs were prohibitive, so in 1996 IAD voted to formally wean itself off Andrews University by establishing IATS which graduated its first ministerial doctorates in 2007 and won full accreditation in 2011.

Centers
IATS courses are taught on the following IAD campuses:

Colombia Adventist University—Colombia
Central American Adventist University —Costa Rica
Cuba Adventist Seminary—Cuba
Dominican Adventist University—Dominican Republic
Haitian Adventist University—Haiti
Northern Caribbean University—Jamaica
University of Montemorelos—Mexico
Antillean Adventist University—Puerto Rico
University of the Southern Caribbean—Trinidad
Venezuelan Adventist University—Venezuela

Programs
IATS offers the following accredited degree programs:
 Master of Arts (MA) in Pastoral Theology.
 Master of Arts in Religion.
 Doctor of Ministry (D.Min.) (Mexico, Jamaica and Costa Rica)

See also

 List of Seventh-day Adventist colleges and universities

References

External links
 Inter-American Adventist Theological Seminary

Seventh-day Adventist education
Seventh-day Adventist theology
History of the Seventh-day Adventist Church